The 2012–13 South West Peninsula League season was the sixth in the history of the South West Peninsula League, a football competition in England, that feeds the Premier Division of the Western Football League. The league had been formed in 2007 from the merger of the Devon County League and the South Western League, and is restricted to clubs based in Cornwall and Devon. The Premier Division of the South West Peninsula League is on the same level of the National League System as the Western League Division One.

Premier Division

The Premier Division featured 20 teams, the same as the previous season, after Royal Marines were relegated and subsequently folded, and Buckland Athletic were promoted to the Western League Premier Division. Dartmouth resigned before the season began. Two new clubs joined the league:

Liverton United, champions of Division One East.
Newquay, champions of Division One West.
Only Plymouth Parkway applied for promotion to the Western League Premier Division. They were to be promoted if their application was accepted and they finished in either of the top two places in the league. However, they eventually refused promotion on financial grounds.

League table

Division One East
Division One East was reduced to sixteen clubs from seventeen after the resignation of Ottery St Mary, the promotion of Liverton United to the Premier Division and the transfer of Plymstock United from Division One West.

Division One West
Sticker were promoted from the East Cornwall League, replacing Newquay who were promoted to the Premier Division. Plymstock United transferred to Division One East, reducing the number of clubs from seventeen to sixteen.

References

External links
 South West Peninsula League

South West Peninsula League
10